Antonio de Oro Pulido (Ciempozuelos (Madrid), 13 April 1904 – Tetuán, 28 December 1940) was a Spanish military officer, explorer and colonial administrator.

Biography 
Oro came to the Spanish territories in Africa with the rank of captain, and eventually rose to the rank of lieutenant colonel. In 1938, he founded the city of El Aaiún, which in 1940 became the capital of Spanish Sahara. He died on 28 December 1940 from sudden sepsis.

There is a street named after him in Ciempozuelos (Calle Capitán Antonio de Oro).

References 

1904 births
1940 deaths
People from Las Vegas (comarca)
20th-century Spanish military personnel
Spanish colonial governors and administrators
History of Western Sahara
Spanish colonels
Spanish city founders
Deaths from sepsis